The Men's 4×200 Freestyle Relay event at the 10th FINA World Aquatics Championships swam on July 23, 2003. Preliminary heats swam in the morning session that day, with the top eight teams advancing to swim again in the Final that evening.

At the start of the event, the existing World (WR) and Championship (CR) records were both:
WR and CR: 7:04.66 swum by Australia on July 27, 2001 in Fukuoka, Japan

Results

Final

Preliminaries

References

Swimming at the 2003 World Aquatics Championships